George Prynne may refer to:

 George Fellowes Prynne (1853–1927), English architect
 George Rundle Prynne (1818–1903), English Anglo-Catholic cleric